James S. Tisch (born January 2, 1953) has been the CEO of Loews Corporation since 1999.

Early life and education
He was born in 1953 in Atlantic City, New Jersey to Wilma "Billie" Stein and Laurence Tisch. His father was co-chairman of Loews Corporation along with his uncle Preston Robert Tisch.

In 1971, James graduated from Suffield Academy in Suffield, Connecticut. He went on to earn a B.A. from Cornell University and an M.B.A. at the Wharton School of the University of Pennsylvania.

Career
Tisch's other positions include a seat in the directorate of the Federal Reserve Bank of New York, the chairmanship of WNET, membership in the Council on Foreign Relations, and seats on the boards of General Electric, Mount Sinai Hospital, New York, and the New York Public Library.

Philanthropy and political donations
James and wife Merryl donated $40 million to establish The Tisch Cancer Institute, a state-of-the-art, patient-oriented comprehensive cancer care and research facility at the Mount Sinai Hospital, New York.

Tisch was a supporter of Rudolph Giuliani and is one of the more prominent donors to the Republican party, and was notable for supporting Joe Lhota for New York City mayor in 2013.

Personal life
Tisch is married to Merryl (née Hiat) Tisch. She is a member of the New York State Board of Regents and the chairwoman of the board of the Metropolitan Council on Jewish Poverty. They have three children:
Jessica Sarah Tisch (born 1981) - earned law and business degrees from Harvard University in three years .In 2006, she married Daniel Zachary Levine in a ceremony officiated by her maternal grandfather, Rabbi Philip Hiat, at the Central Synagogue in Manhattan.  Since 2008, she has held various civilian managerial tiles for the New York City Police Department; in February 2014, she was appointed Deputy Commissioner Information Technology for the NYPD. In November 2019, she was appointed Commissioner for NYC Department of Information Technology and Telecommunication by Mayor de Blasio. 
Benjamin Jacob Tisch (born 1983) - worked for the hedge fund Fortress Investment and then as a portfolio manager in the investment department of the Loews Corporation. In 2011, he married Daniela Weber in a ceremony officiated by Hiat at the Central Synagogue in Manhattan.
Samuel Aaron Tisch (born 1985) works for Citigroup and in 2013, he married Eliana Bavli in a ceremony presided over by Hiat at the Park Avenue Armory in Manhattan.

References

External links
 James S Tisch. Forbes. Accessed 2011-03-10.
 James S. Tisch. General Electric. Accessed 2011-03-10.

1953 births
Living people
Cornell University alumni
Jewish American philanthropists
American chief executives
American billionaires
Wharton School of the University of Pennsylvania alumni
James S. Tisch
American philanthropists
Heads of the Jewish Agency for Israel
Fellows of the American Academy of Arts and Sciences